Ben Bard (January 26, 1893 – May 17, 1974) was an American movie actor, stage actor, and acting teacher. With comedian Jack Pearl, Bard worked in a comedy duo in vaudeville. 

In 1926, Bard, Pearl, and Sascha Beaumont appeared in a short film made in Lee DeForest's Phonofilm sound-on-film process. He had a small role in The Bat Whispers (1930). Later in the decade, he ran a leading Hollywood acting school, Ben Bard Drama.

Bard was recruited to be a leading man at Fox Film Corporation. However, he was typecast as a "Suave Heavy"—a smooth-talking, well-dressed fellow with a dark side. An example of this type is his portrayal of "Mr. Brun" in The Seventh Victim (1943). Also in 1943, Bard appeared in two other Val Lewton-produced horror films: The Leopard Man, as Robles, the Police Chief, and The Ghost Ship, as First Officer Bowns.

Bard became the head of the New Talent Department at Twentieth-Century-Fox in September 1956, eventually resigning in August 1959. He re-opened his school, Ben Bard Drama, in 1960.

Personal life
 In 1929 he married the serial film star Ruth Roland, and was married to Roland until her death in 1937.
 In 1939, he married Roma Clarisse, an actress and last recipient of the Ruth Roland Scholarship to Ben Bard Drama. They had 3 children before she died in 1947.
 In 1948 Bard married Jackie Lynn Taylor, an actress in the Our Gang series. They divorced in 1954.

Death
Bard died in Los Angeles in 1974, aged 81. His resting place is with Ruth Roland in an unmarked grave at Forest Lawn Memorial Park in Glendale, California. He is survived by his two sons, Bryan Barak Bard, a video documentary artist, and Bartley Bard, a professional director and screenwriter.

Selected filmography
 Sandy (1926)
 My Own Pal (1926)
 7th Heaven (1927)
 Two Flaming Youths (1927)
 Love Makes 'Em Wild (1927)
 The Secret Studio (1927)
 Come to My House (1927)
 Dressed to Kill (1928)
 No Other Woman (1928)
 Fleetwing (1928)
 Romance of the Underworld (1928)
 Love and the Devil (1929)
 Born Reckless (1930)
 The Bat Whispers (1930)
 Meet the Baron (1933)
 Black Angel (1946) (bartender)

References

External links

Ben Bard at Virtual History

1893 births
1974 deaths
American male film actors
American male silent film actors
American male stage actors
Burials at Forest Lawn Memorial Park (Glendale)
Drama teachers
Jewish American male actors
Vaudeville performers
Male actors from Milwaukee
20th-century American male actors